Paullina is a city in O'Brien County, Iowa, United States. The population was 982 at the 2020 census.

History
Paullina was laid out in 1882 when the Chicago & Northwestern Railway was extended to that point. It was named for the Paullin brothers, who owned the town site.

Geography
Paullina is located at  (42.978578, -95.687080).

Demographics

2010 census
As of the census of 2010, there were 1,056 people, 496 households, and 309 families living in the city. The racial makeup of the city was 98.7% White, 0.8% African American, 0.1% from other races, and 0.5% from two or more races. Hispanic or Latino of any race were 1.2% of the population.

There were 496 households, of which 24.4% had children under the age of 18 living with them, 52.0% were married couples living together, 6.3% had a female householder with no husband present, 4.0% had a male householder with no wife present, and 37.7% were non-families. 35.9% of all households were made up of individuals, and 22.3% had someone living alone who was 65 years of age or older. The average household size was 2.13 and the average family size was 2.72.

The median age in the city was 48.9 years. 21.5% of residents were under the age of 18; 5.6% were between the ages of 18 and 24; 17.6% were from 25 to 44; 27.3% were from 45 to 64; and 28.2% were 65 years of age or older. The gender makeup of the city was 48.5% male and 51.5% female.

2000 census
As of the census of 2000, there were 1,124 people, 508 households, and 322 families living in the city. The racial makeup of the city was 99.47% White, 0.18% Native American, 0.09% Asian, and 0.27% from two or more races. Hispanic or Latino of any race were 0.89% of the population.

There were 508 households, out of which 21.9% had children under the age of 18 living with them, 55.7% were married couples living together, 5.7% had a female householder with no husband present, and 36.6% were non-families. 34.4% of all households were made up of individuals, and 21.5% had someone living alone who was 65 years of age or older. The average household size was 2.14 and the average family size was 2.73.

In the city, the population was spread out, with 19.9% under the age of 18, 6.4% from 18 to 24, 19.3% from 25 to 44, 23.4% from 45 to 64, and 31.0% who were 65 years of age or older. The median age was 48 years. For every 100 females there were 84.6 males. For every 100 females age 18 and over, there were 80.4 males.

The median income for a household in the city was $32,188, and the median income for a family was $42,569. Males had a median income of $29,293 versus $20,833 for females. The per capita income for the city was $17,644. About 5.1% of families and 9.1% of the population were below the poverty line, including 5.6% of those under age 18 and 12.7% of those age 65 or over.

Education
Paullina is served by the South O'Brien Community School District. The district was formed on July 1, 1993 by the merger of three school districts: Paullina, Primghar, and Sutherland. Paullina is home to the Junior High/High School which houses grades 7-12.

See also

 List of cities in Iowa

References

External links

 Paullina, Iowa Portal style website, Government, Business, Recreation and more
 City-Data Comprehensive Statistical Data and more about Paullina

Cities in O'Brien County, Iowa
Cities in Iowa
Populated places established in 1882
1882 establishments in Iowa